Sarah Sokolovic (born 1980) is an American film, television, and theatre actress, who starred in Homeland as Laura Sutton and has a recurring role on Big Little Lies. She has performed in several plays including The Shaggs: Philosophy of the World, Detroit, and A Streetcar Named Desire.

Early life 
Sokolovic graduated in 2011 from the Yale School of Drama. Her father is Dimso "Dan" Sokolovic, of Serbian descent who immigrated to the United States from Germany, and her mother is Donna Stowell, an American of German and English descent. She has a brother Stevan and a sister Stephanie.

Career

Theatre work 
Sokolovic started her career in theatre, she performed the role Betty in the musical The Shaggs: Philosophy of the World at Playwrights Horizons in New York City, for which she was nominated for the Drama Desk Award for Outstanding Featured Actress in a Musical. Later she performed in the play Detroit at Playwrights Horizons along with Amy Ryan, David Schwimmer, John Cullum, and Darren Pettie. In 2013, she performed in the A Streetcar Named Desire at the Yale Repertory Theatre along with Adam O'Byrne.

Film and television 
In 2013, Sokolovic played Gwen, a prostitute in the crime thriller Cold Comes the Night, directed by Tze Chun and starring Alice Eve and Bryan Cranston. It was released domestically on January 10, 2014.

In 2014, Sokolovic played Maveen Lyttle in the crime film Every Secret Thing along with Diane Lane, Elizabeth Banks, and Dakota Fanning, directed by Amy J. Berg, and released on May 15, 2015.

In June 2015, Sokolovic was cast in Homeland's season 5 as Laura Sutton, an American journalist in Berlin who works for the Düring Foundation.

Since 2017, she has played the role of Tori Bachman on the award-winning TV show Big Little Lies.

Sokolovic has also acted on the TV series The Good Wife, Timeless and Unforgettable.

Filmography

Film

Television

Awards and nominations

References

External links 
 

Living people
1980 births
American film actresses
American television actresses
American stage actresses
21st-century American actresses
Yale School of Drama alumni
American people of Serbian descent
Place of birth missing (living people)
American people of German descent
American people of English descent